The nested sampling algorithm is a computational approach to the Bayesian statistics problems of comparing models and generating samples from posterior distributions. It was developed in 2004 by physicist John Skilling.

Background
The posterior probability for  may be calculated as:

 

However, the remaining Bayes factor  is not so easy to evaluate, since in general it requires marginalizing nuisance parameters. Generally,  has a set of parameters that can be grouped together and called , and  has its own vector of parameters that may be of different dimensionality, but is still termed .

 

This integral is often analytically intractable, and in these cases it is necessary to employ a numerical algorithm to find an approximation. The nested sampling algorithm was developed by John Skilling specifically to approximate these marginalization integrals, and it has the added benefit of generating samples from the posterior distribution . It is an alternative to methods from the Bayesian literature  such as bridge sampling and defensive importance sampling.

 Start with  points  sampled from prior.
     current likelihood values of the points;
     
     
     
     Save the point with least likelihood as a sample point with weight .
     Update the point with least likelihood with some Markov chain Monte Carlo steps according to the prior, accepting only steps that
     keep the likelihood above .
 end
 return ;

 

This can be thought of as a Bayesian's way to numerically implement Lebesgue integration.

Implementations
Example implementations demonstrating the nested sampling algorithm are publicly available for download, written in several programming languages.
 Simple examples in C, R, or Python are on John Skilling's website.
 A Haskell port of the above simple codes is on Hackage.
 An example in C++, named Diamonds, is on GitHub.
 A highly modular Python parallel example for statistical physics and condensed matter physics uses is on GitHub.
 pymatnest is a Python package designed for exploring the energy landscape of different materials, calculating thermodynamic variables at arbitrary temperatures and locating phase transitions is on GitHub.
 The MultiNest software package is capable of performing nested sampling on multi-modal posterior distributions. It has interfaces for C++, Fortran and Python inputs, and is available on GitHub.
 PolyChord is another nested sampling software package available on GitHub. PolyChord's computational efficiency scales better with an increase in the number of parameters than MultiNest, meaning PolyChord can be more efficient for high dimensional problems.
 NestedSamplers.jl a Julia package for implementing single- and multi-ellipsoidal nested sampling algorithms is on GitHub.
 Korali is a high-performance framework for uncertainty quantification, optimization, and deep reinforcement learning, which also implements nested sampling.

Applications
Since nested sampling was proposed in 2004, it has been used in many aspects of the field of astronomy. One paper suggested using nested sampling for cosmological model selection and object detection, as it "uniquely combines accuracy, general applicability and computational feasibility." A refinement of the algorithm to handle multimodal posteriors has been suggested as a means to detect astronomical objects in extant datasets. Other applications of nested sampling are in the field of finite element updating where the algorithm is used to choose an optimal finite element model, and this was applied to structural dynamics. This sampling method has also been used in the field of materials modeling. It can be used to learn the partition function from statistical mechanics and derive thermodynamic properties.

Dynamic nested sampling

Dynamic nested sampling is a generalisation of the nested sampling algorithm in which the number of samples taken in different regions of the parameter space is dynamically adjusted to maximise calculation accuracy. This can lead to large improvements in accuracy and computational efficiency when compared to the original nested sampling algorithm, in which the allocation of samples cannot be changed and often many samples are taken in regions which have little effect on calculation accuracy.

Publicly available dynamic nested sampling software packages include:
  - a Python implementation of dynamic nested sampling which can be downloaded from GitHub.
 dyPolyChord: a software package which can be used with Python, C++ and Fortran likelihood and prior distributions. dyPolyChord is available on GitHub.

Dynamic nested sampling has been applied to a variety of scientific problems, including analysis of gravitational waves, mapping distances in space and exoplanet detection.

See also
Bayesian model comparison
List of algorithms

References

Bayesian statistics
Model selection
Randomized algorithms